Leger Douzable Jr. (born May 31, 1986) is an American football defensive end who is currently a free agent. He was signed by the Minnesota Vikings as an undrafted free agent in 2008. He played college football at UCF. Douzable has also played for the New York Giants, Jacksonville Jaguars, St. Louis Rams, Detroit Lions, Tennessee Titans, New York Jets, Buffalo Bills, and San Francisco 49ers.

Early years
He was a 2-year letter winner at Alonso High School in Tampa. As a senior, he finished with 50 tackles and 10 sacks and also returned an interception for a touchdown along with blocking two field goals and forcing two fumbles. He was a second-team All-County selection as a senior.

College career
Douzable ended his 2007 season with 49 tackles and seven sacks, bringing his career totals to 102 tackles and 14 sacks and was awarded first-team All-Conference USA. In 2006, he made nine starts and saw action in all 12 games, splitting time between defensive tackle and defensive end. He was third-team All-Conference USA after leading the team with seven sacks and 10½ tackles for loss. In 2005, he played in 12 games, including one start as a sophomore, and ended the season with 17 tackles and two tackles for loss. In 2004, he played in all 11 games as a true freshman at defensive tackle and ended the season with four total tackles.

Professional career

Minnesota Vikings
Douzable began his rookie season on the Minnesota practice squad until being waived on September 8, 2008.

New York Giants
He signed to the New York Giants practice squad on September 11, 2008, and spent the majority of the season there before joining the Giants’ active roster (12/3) and inactive for the Giants over the final four games of the 2008 regular season and the NFC Divisional Playoff. He was released in September 2009.

St. Louis Rams
On September 17, 2009, Douzable was signed to the practice squad by St. Louis and thirteen days later was called up to the active roster. For the 2009 season, he played in 12 games (started 1) posting 16 tackles (11 solo), including five tackles for loss to tie for second-most on the team and also had four quarterback hits.

The St. Louis Rams waived Douzable on June 28, 2010.

Detroit Lions
Douzable was claimed off waivers by the Detroit Lions on June 29, 2010. He was waived by the Lions on August 4.

Jacksonville Jaguars
Douzable was signed by the Jacksonville Jaguars on August 8, 2010, and made the Jaguars 53-man opening day roster. In 15 games of the 2010 season, Douzable made 8 tackles. He played 16 games (started 6) in 2011 with 38 tackles, 1 sack, and 1 pass defended.

New York Jets
Douzable was signed by the New York Jets on July 25, 2013. Douzable played in every game for the Jets over three seasons and saw a good amount of playing time as a reserve on the team’s defensive line doing most of his work as a run-stopper and recording 59 tackles and four sacks over those 48 games with the Jets.

Buffalo Bills
Douzable was signed by the Buffalo Bills on June 13, 2016.

San Francisco 49ers
Douzable was signed by the San Francisco 49ers on August 14, 2017 He was released on September 1, 2017. He was re-signed on October 17, 2017.

Personal life
Douzable's biological father is of Haitian descent.

References

External links
 Official website
 UCF Knights bio

1986 births
Living people
Players of American football from Tampa, Florida
American football defensive tackles
American sportspeople of Haitian descent
UCF Knights football players
Minnesota Vikings players
New York Giants players
St. Louis Rams players
Detroit Lions players
Jacksonville Jaguars players
Tennessee Titans players
New York Jets players
Buffalo Bills players
San Francisco 49ers players